The Haixun-class cutter (Type 718 Cutter) is a single-ship class of cutter used by the China Coast Guard. A single ship, 1001 Haijing, was launched in 2006 and performs law enforcement patrols from Shanghai to protect Chinese sovereignty. It is the coast guard's most modern vessel.

References

China Coast Guard ships
2006 ships